Biertowice  is a village in the administrative district of Gmina Sułkowice, within Myślenice County, Lesser Poland Voivodeship, in southern Poland.

The village has a population of 900.

References

Biertowice